Trudi is a given name. Notable people with the name include:

Trudi Ames (born 1946), American actress
Trudi Birger (1927–2002) German Holocaust survivor and writer
Trudi Canavan (born 1969), Australian writer
Trudi Le Caine (1911–1999), German arts patron
Trudi Carter (born 1994), Jamaican footballer
Trudi Guda (born 1940), Surinamese poet
Trudi Lacey (born 1958), American basketball coach
Trudi Lenon, Australian murderer
Trudi Maree (born 1988), South African swimmer
Trudi Makhaya, South African economist
Trudi Meyer (1914–1999), German Olympic athlete
Trudi Musgrave (born 1977), Australian tennis player
Trudi Roth (born 1930), Swiss film actress
Trudi Schmidt (born 1938), Democratic Party member of the Montana Legislature, representing District 11 since 2011
Trudi Schoop (1904–1999), Swiss dancer
Trudi Trueit (born 1963), American author
Trudi Walend (born 1943), Republican member of the North Carolina General Assembly
Trudi Wilkes (born 1973), British voice artist
Trudi Williams (born 1953), Florida Republican politician

See also
Trudy (disambiguation)